is a private railway in Japan, founded in 1884. The name Nankai (which means "South Sea") comes from the company's routes along the Nankaidō, the old highway that ran south from the old capital, Kyoto, along the sea coast. Nankai predates all the electric railways in the Tokyo region.

The Nankai network branches out in a generally southern direction from Namba Station in Osaka. The Nankai Main Line connects Osaka to Wakayama, with an important spur branching to Kansai International Airport. The rapi:t α express connects Kansai International Airport to Namba in 34 minutes, while the rapi:t β takes 39 minutes with two additional stops. The Koya Line connects Osaka to Mt. Koya, headquarters of the Buddhist Shingon sect and a popular pilgrimage site. IC cards (PiTaPa and ICOCA) are accepted.

History 

The Nankai Railway Company was founded on June 16, 1884. In 1944 it was one of the companies that merged to form Kinki Nippon Railway Co., Ltd. (Kin-nichi, present Kintetsu Railway). However, Kin-nichi transferred the former Nankai Railway Company's lines to the present Nankai Electric Railway Co., Ltd. (named Koyasan Electric Railway Co., Ltd. from March 28, 1925 until March 14, 1947) on June 1, 1947.

From 1938 to 1988, Nankai Electric Railway owned the Nankai Hawks, a team in Nippon Professional Baseball that was based in Osaka. The team was sold to Daiei after the 1988 season and moved to Fukuoka and rechristened the Fukuoka Daiei Hawks. The team was sold again in 2005 to SoftBank, and are now the Fukuoka SoftBank Hawks.

Lines

Nankai Main Line (南海本線): Namba – Wakayamashi
Takashinohama Line (高師浜線): Hagoromo – Takashinohama
 Airport Line (空港線): Izumisano – Kansai Airport
Tanagawa Line (多奈川線): Misaki koen – Tanagawa
Kada Line (加太線): Kinokawa – Kada
Wakayamako Line (和歌山港線): Wakayamashi – Wakayamako

Koya Line (高野線): Shiomibashi - Kishinosato-Tamade – Gokurakubashi
In operation: Namba - Gokurakubashi
Shiomibashi Line (汐見橋線, commonly called): Shiomibashi – Kishinosato-Tamade
Cable Line (鋼索線): Gokurakubashi – Koyasan

Defunct lines and transferred lines
Nankai Line (南海線) 
Tennoji Branch (天王寺支線): Tengachaya – Tennoji (replaced by the Sakaisuji Line)
Kitajima Branch (北島支線): Wakayamashi – Kitajima - Higashi-Matsue (abandoned)
Wakayamako Line (和歌山港線): Wakayamako – Suiken (abandoned)
Kishigawa Line (貴志川線, dealt with Wakayama Electric Railway Co., Ltd. (和歌山電鐵株式会社)): Wakayama – Kishi
Osaka Tram Line (大阪軌道線)
Hankai Line (阪堺線): Ebisucho – Hamadera-eki-mae (dealt with Hankai Tramway Co., Ltd.)
Uemachi Line (上町線): Tennoji-eki-mae – Sumiyoshikoen (dealt with Hankai Tramway Co., Ltd.)
Hirano Line (平野線): Imaike – Hirano (replaced by the Tanimachi Line)
Ohama Branch (大浜支線): Shukuin – Ohama-kaigan (abandoned)
Wakayama Tram Line (和歌山軌道線): Wakayamashi-eki, Wakayama-eki – Kainan, Shin-Wakaura (abandoned)

Rolling stock

Limited express trains 
 50000 series — used on rapi:t service between Namba and Kansai airport
 31000 series — used on Kōya service between Namba and Gokurakubashi
 30000 series — used on Kōya service between Namba and Gokurakubashi
 12000 series — used on Southern service reserved car between Namba and Wakayamakō
 11000 series — used on Rinkan service between Namba and Hashimoto
 10000 series — used on Southern service reserved car between Namba and Wakayamakō

Nankai Line, Airport Line 
 9000 series — used on Southern service non-reserved car between Namba and Wakayamakō
 8300 series — used on Southern service non-reserved car between Namba and Wakayamakō
 8000 series — used on Southern service non-reserved car between Namba and Wakayamakō
 7100 series — used on Southern service non-reserved car between Namba and Wakayamakō
 3000 series — converted from former Semboku 3000 series
 2000 series
 1000 series

Kōya Line Commuter car (Namba-Hashimoto) 
 8300 series
 6300 series — converted from former 6100 series
 6250 series — converted from former 8200 series
 6200 series
 6000 series
 1000 series

Kōya Line Zoom car (Namba-Gokurakubashi) 
 2300 series
 2200 series — used on Tenkū service
 2000 series

Takashinohama Line, Tanagawa Line, Kada Line, Shiomibashi Line 
 7100 series
 2220 series
 2200 series

Cable Line 
 N10 / N20

See also
Hankai Tramway Co., Ltd.
Semboku Rapid Railway Co.,Ltd.

References

External links

Companies based in Osaka Prefecture
Companies listed on the Tokyo Stock Exchange
Companies listed on the Osaka Exchange
Railway companies of Japan
Rail transport in Osaka Prefecture
Midori-kai
Japanese companies established in 1884
Nankai Group
Railway companies established in 1884